The Oulunsalo Church is an evangelical Lutheran church in the Finnish city of Oulu. It was part of the town of Oulunsalo until 2013 when that town was merged into Oulu.

The wooden church building has been designed in Gothic Revival style by architect Julius Basilier. It was built between 1888 and 1891. The former Oulunsalo church was destroyed in a fire caused by lightning in the summer 1882.

References

External links 

Lutheran churches in Oulu
Churches completed in 1891
Wooden churches in Finland